Whitfield is an unincorporated community in Hickman County, in the U.S. state of Tennessee.

History
A post office was established at Whitfield in 1856, and remained in operation until it was discontinued in 1905. The community was named for John W. Whitfield, a State Senator and native of Hickman County.

References

Unincorporated communities in Hickman County, Tennessee
Unincorporated communities in Tennessee